Memoirs of a Curb Server is the seventh studio album by American rapper J. Stalin, released on July 10, 2012 via Town Thizzness & Fontana. It peaked at #54 on the R&B/Hip-Hop Albums chart, #16 on the Heatseekers Albums chart, and at the top spot on the Top Heatseekers Pacific chart, making it J. Stalin's most successful album to date. It is also the most successful album for the INgrooves imprint.

The album features guest appearances from E-40, The Jacka, Mistah F.A.B., Richie Rich, Too Short, and Yukmouth, among others.

Music videos have been filmed for the songs "Lyrical Exercise" featuring L' Jay; "Who Are U?"; "Pigeon Coop" featuring Ya Boy, L' Jay, and Shady Nate; "Something New, Pt. 2" featuring Sneaky Mike; "Curb Servin'" featuring Mayback and 4Rax; "Money & Bitches"; and "Try'na Get On" featuring Armani de Paul and Philthy Rich.

Track listing

References

2012 albums
J. Stalin albums